"The Rigga Ding Dong Song" is the debut single by the group Passion Fruit, released in 1999. The song is the group's most successful hit, reaching the top 10 in several countries, including Germany, Austria and Switzerland and the top 20 in the Netherlands. The original line-up can be seen in the single's cover sleeve and music video.

Track listing
CD single
"The Rigga-Ding-Dong-Song" (Radio Mix) - 3:25	
"The Rigga-Ding-Dong-Song" (Extended Mix) - 5:12

CD maxi (Sony)
"The Rigga-Ding-Dong-Song" (Radio Mix) - 3:25	
"The Rigga-Ding-Dong-Song" (Extended Mix) - 5:12	
"The Rigga-Ding-Dong-Song" (Plastic Bubble Mix) - 5:03	
"The Rigga-Ding-Dong-Song" (Munsta Groove Mix) - 5:41

12" (Radikal)
"The Rigga-Ding-Dong-Song" (Extended Mix) - 5:12	
"The Rigga-Ding-Dong-Song" (Radio Mix) - 3:25	
"The Rigga-Ding-Dong-Song" (Plastic Bubble Mix) - 5:03	
"The Rigga-Ding-Dong-Song" (Munsta Groove Mix) - 5:41

Charts

Weekly charts

Year-end charts

Cherona version

Exactly ten years to the Passion Fruit release, the German pop group Cherona released its version titled "Rigga-Ding-Dong-Song" in 2009 dropping the definite article "the" from the title. The Cherona version on Columbia Records accompanied by a music video became a minor hit in Europe, particularly Germany (peak #56) and Austria (peak #48). The song appeared on the band's 2009 album Sound of Cherona.

Charts

Leticia cover

In 2010, German-Cuban singer Leticia (full name Leticia Pareja Padron) released her own remixed revamped version with new arrangement under the title "The Rigga Digga Ding Song" with her record label NoWa. The single cover claims Leticia is "The voice of Passion Fruit". The track was produced by Robert Meister.

Track listing
"The Rigga Digga Ding Dong Song" (Radio-Mix) - 3:25	
"The Rigga Digga Ding Dong Song" (Extended Dance Mix) - 5:48

References

1999 songs
1999 debut singles
2009 singles
2010 singles
Eurodance songs
Columbia Records singles
Sony Music singles